Bence Bicsák (born 19 October 1995) is a Hungarian professional triathlete. He is a member of the Hungarian 2020 Olympic Triathlon team. He competed in the men's individual event at the 2020 Tokyo Olympic Summer Games. He placed 7th out of 51 Olympians that started the race.

At the 2020 Tokyo Olympics, Bicsák competed in the inaugural Triathlon - Mixed-Relay event. The Hungarian team composed of two men and two women finished in 11th position.  The Hungarian national team members, followed by their race start numbers and links to their official Olympic Athlete profiles were; Zsanett Bragmayer 15A, Bence Bicsák 15B, Zsofia Kovacs 15C,  and Tamás Toth 15D.

The Hungarian Triathlon Union and the Hungarian Olympic Committee did consider Bence Bicsák as the athlete that could potentially earn Hungary's first triathlon Olympic medal.  Previous to Bence Bicsák's 7th-place finish, Hungary's best triathlon Olympic finish to date was from Csaba Kuttor who finished 30th at the 2000 Sydney Olympic games.

No Hungarian triathlete, even those that have participated in numerous Olympics have ever been ranked higher than Bence Bicsák's current ranking by World Triathlon.

World Triathlon organizes top-level international race events. Bicsák competes within the top-tier World Triathlon Championship Series (WTCS) and also at numerous World Triathlon Cups.

Since 2014, Bicsák's race results have brought him much national attention. His career has been watched closely. As a triathlete, he has been a member of the PSN zrt (Pécsi Sport Nonprofit) triathlon team since 2015. The PSN zrt team is based in the city of Pécs where Bence Bicsák resides and where he completed his university degree. He graduated with a Major in Business Administration and Management from the university of Pécs, (Pécsi Tudományegyetem).

Szilárd Tóth is Bicsák's primary coach, and is also the head of the PSN Triathlon Department, which has nearly 50 staff members.  Bicsák routinely trains with and competes against fellow Hungarian team member Faldum Gábor. Faldum was an Olympic triathlete at the 2016 Rio de Janeiro Olympic Games. (Faldum is currently ranked 72nd.) Additionally, as part of the Hungarian National team, Bicsák attended foreign training camps where he trained and competed with 2016 and 2020 Olympic triathlete Támas Tóth. During the 2020 Summer Olympic Games, Támas placed 19th. During the 2016 Summer Olympic Games, Támas placed 33rd and his fellow Hungarian countryman Gabor placed 20th.

As of 28 July 2021, the rankings of Bence Bicsák are;
 2020 Tokyo Olympics Triathlon Men's individual event 7th
World Ranking 21
 World Triathlon Championship Series Ranking 17th
 Continental Ranking 15th
76 Starts, 14 Podiums, 8 Wins

Childhood and early life 
Bence Bicsák was a continually active child, loved to play outside, always enjoyed hobbies and new sports. Running, swimming, cycling, soccer, basketball were some of the sports that gave him pleasure. When he was around 7 or 8 years old, he practiced swimming a few times per week. He did not enjoy it much, was not successful in competitions, but his parents persuaded him to continue. In the meantime, he continued with other sports.

When he was around 11 or 12 years old, his parents, who ran as a hobby, took the young Bence Bicsák to a race. The race gave him enjoyment.

A local coach, István Góczán, of the Triathlon Association in Zalaegerszeg contacted Bicsák and asked him to participate in an aquathlon competition. Aquathlon is a race combining swimming and running. Bence did well in the swim and ran his way up to finish first. To his surprise, Bence had earned a gold medal.  He had never won a running race before. The race was the spark that set him on an exceptionally long and challenging path to eventually becoming a top-10 triathlete. When he was 15 years old, Bicsák decided to take up the sport of triathlon. At some point, István Góczán asked the young Bence Bicsák at what age he wanted to reach his top performance level, physically and mentally. Bence Bicsák's answer was "between 25 and 28".

Personal life
Bence Bicsák has one sibling that is about two years younger. His sister Flora Bicsák competed for many years in the sports of triathlon, duathlon, and athletics. From 2010 to 2019, Flora competed in numerous athletics events. In 2019, before COVID-19 affected the competition schedules, Flora won two Golds and a Silver in the 5,000 m category and a Gold in the 3,000 m category. In their teens, Bence and Flora would often train together. Flora Bicsák competed in the 2014 Nanjing Youth Olympic Games.

Bence Bicsák's parents are both medical doctors, and as a hobby they practiced the sport of half-marathon for numerous years.

Career

2012-2011: Learning, training and progressing 
In the years 2011 and 2012, Bence Bicsák competed in six European Triathlon Union events. In half the events, he placed in the top 10.

On September 1, 2012, in Aguilas, Spain, he and his Hungarian teammates won a silver medal at the ETU Triathlon U23 and Youth European Championships Youth Relay.

Bicsák was a member of the Triathlon Club of Zalaegerszeg and trained with the Mogyi SE Baja-Pécs team (now known as Mogyi SE Baja team) during the summer of 2012.

2013: First Hungarian to qualify for the World Championships 
For 2013, the World Triathlon rankings database indicates that Bence Bicsák competed in 6 triathlon events. He won one Gold. Overall, in 25% of the events, he placed within the top 10.
 
On June 15 at the 2013 Triathlon European Championships in Alanya, Turkey, Bence Bicsák placed an unexpected 10th place in the Junior Men category.
 
He became the first Hungarian to qualify for the World Championships. The experience gained by Bicsák at the Grand Final event in London, was significant. Jacob Birtwhistle, Tyler Mislawchuk, and Kristian Blummenfelt who would each hold a top-10 Olympic Qualification ranking in 2020 and 2021 were also present at the Grand Final.
 
Despite his Junior age, on July 21, 2013, he competed for the first time in the Elite Men category during the 2013 Tartu ITU Sprint Triathlon European Cup. He placed 21st out of 47 competitors. Bence Bicsák time was 00:57:28, Kristian Blummenfelt of Norway came in first with a time of 00:55:36.
 
On August 3, 2013, he placed first at the Hungarian Triathlon Junior National Championships.
 
In 2013, he also won a gold medal in the Hungarian National Duathlon Championship.
 
For 2013, Bence Bicsák had designed his training plan. His father, who had previously competed in the half-marathon sport, also provided some assistance. The young athlete's training regiment was; training once or twice per day, swimming six times per week, cycling three times per week or more during spring and summer, and running four or five times per week. The overall training was; 14 to 15 training sessions in the winter and between 16 and 18 in the summer.
 
As a member of the Triathlon Club of Zalaegerszeg, Bence Bicsák received coaching assistance from; Csaba Horváth and Tamás Horváth for swimming, István Góczán for running, Tamás Binder and Miklós Déri for cycling.
 
During the summer of 2013, he also trained with the team of Mogyi SE Baja-Pécs.

2014: Numerous successes. Heads off to university 
For 2014, the World Triathlon rankings database indicates that Bence Bicsák competed in 8 triathlon events. He won three Golds and one Bronze. Overall, in 75% of the events, he placed within the top 10.

In 2014, as a Junior he finished 12th in the World Triathlon Grand Final in Edmonton, and also as a Junior he finished 5th at the Kitzbühel ETU Triathlon European Championships. As a Junior, he also won two European Cups, one in Tiszaujvaros, and another in Holten.

In 2014, and for the second year in a row, Bence Bicsák won a gold medal in Hungary's National Sprint Distance Duathlon Championship. During the same year, his younger sister, Flora Bicsák, also won a gold medal at the National Duathlon Championships of Hungary. Beating 542 other competitors, Flora Bicsák also won a silver medal at the 2014 National Cross Country Championships. Both siblings, Bence and Flora, often trained together for triathlons. Their athletic success in 2014 yielded national media attention.

At the 2014 Kitzbühel ETU Triathlon European Championships, Alistair Brownlee (the 2012 London Olympic Champion) won gold in the Men's Elite category. Shortly after Alistair's win, both Bence and his sister Flora were photographed with and inspired by Alistair Brownlee. Such inspiration helped the young Bence Bicsák go on to achieve future success as a professional triathlete. His sister Flora would participate a few months later in two events at the 2014 Nanjing Youth Olympic Games. Flora Bicsák finished 17th.

It is noteworthy that sibling support and rivalry between triathletes occur frequently. For example, Jonathan Brownlee (Olympic Bronze & Silver medal winner) physically helped his brother Alistair over the finish line during the dramatic finish of the 2016 Cozumel Triathlon World series. The preceding act of sibling love and friendship made world-headlines.

In June 2014, Bence Bicsák graduated from the Zalaegerszegi Zrínyi Miklós Gimnázium (High school). Dr. Lajos Bicsák, the athlete's dad, graduated from the same school in 1983. His younger sister Flora would also graduate from the same school in 2016.

In January 2014. Bence Bicsák signed on as a triathlete of the Mogyi SE Baja-Pécs team.

In 2014, Bence Bicsák got accepted into the Faculty of Business and Economics at the University of Pécs. Many decades earlier, both of his parents had graduated from a university of Pécs. He moved from Zalaegerszeg to the city of Pécs. In 2014 began training as a triathlete for PSN zrt.

2015: Bicsák’s development draws much attention 
In 2015, PSN Zrt Sportiskola (PSN Ltd. Sports School in Pécs) established a new triathlon department led by Toth Szilard. As department head and coach, Szilárd and many of his dedicated staff members provided Bence Bicsák and nearly forty other Hungarian triathletes with excellent training conditions and significant support.  PSN zrt. has 14 sports departments, and significant sports facilities.

2015 was the first year that Bence Bicsák competed as an adult and within the U23 (Under 23 years old) triathlon category. He also began racing the Olympic distance (1.5 km swim, 40 km bike, and 10 km run), a race format twice as long as most of his previous races. For Bicsák, the significantly greater triathlon distances coupled with a much higher level of competition resulted in a much more challenging year.

For 2015, the World Triathlon rankings database indicates that Bence Bicsák competed in 11 triathlon events and had three podium finishes, two Silvers and one Bronze. Overall, he placed within the top 10 in 73% of the events.

Bicsák failed to qualify for the 2015 World Cup Final but reportedly learned a lot from the negative experience. In Hungary, Bicsák's development continued to draw much attention. His training sessions were between 5 and 6 hours per day.

2016: Breakthrough performance. Places 3rd in Cozumel Grand Final 
For 2016, the World Triathlon rankings database indicates that Bence Bicsák competed in 12 triathlon events and had two Bronze finishes.  Overall, he placed within the top 10 in 58% of the events. In 2016, Bence Bicsák competed in Olympic distance triathlon race events within the adult category. The motivation and experience gained by racing against ex-Olympians and potential future Olympians helped Bicsák advance significantly.

In 2016, while being a university student, Bicsák's typical weekly training regimen consisted of two intense, three mid-length, and one challenging long-distance run. The preceding was coupled with daily swims and bicycling three times per week.

In 2016, the Hungarian Triathlon Union awarded the then 20-year-old Bence Bicsák for being the best U23 athlete in 2015.

Bicsák's performance helped the recently created triathlon department in Pécs rank fifth out of 92 Hungarian associations.

Bicsák and fellow triathlete and Pécs teammate Noémi Sárszegi qualified for the 2020 Tokyo Olympic training program. The 2020 Olympic training program began after the 2016 Rio Olympic Games. It provided specialized training camps and competitions to help develop potential Hungarian Olympians. A key objective for Bicsák was preparation by 2018 for the two-year Olympic qualification process for the 2020 Games. During the two-year qualification process, over many races, triathletes accumulate points. The top 55 males and 55 females with the highest points rankings become qualified for the Games.

In 2016, races that are not ITU (International Triathlon Union) events provided Bicsák with additional opportunities to compete, enjoy the sport and improve. In May 2016, Bence Bicsák with his coach Szilárd Tóth and kayaker Vilmos Fodróczi as teammates won the Middle Distance Quadrathlon Championship. Similarly, later in May, and despite having raced for four consecutive weekends, Bicsák won Gold for the third year in a row in Tiszaújváros Sprint Distance triathlon. In September, he won gold in Slovenia with approximately a 2-minute lead.

In June 2016, and despite fighting a viral infection, Bicsák finished 8th at the U23 Triathlon European Championships in Bulgaria, which earned him the qualification rights for the important U23 World triathlon Championships in Mexico.

Described as his breakthrough by World Triathlon, on September 7, 2016, Bence Bicsák earned a Bronze at the 2016 ITU World Triathlon Grand Final Cozumel U23. The podium finish at the Grand Final was against many competitors that held Olympic caliber places in the rankings. His Bronze was remarkable in that he ranked 33rd before the start of the race. After the race, and in the Adult category, Bicsák held the 138th position, a substantial leap from the 360th position he occupied at the beginning of the same year. The Grand Final Bronze was pivotal in the triathlete's career.

2017: Wins his first World Triathlon Cup 
For 2017, the World Triathlon rankings database indicates that Bence Bicsák competed in 11 triathlon events and won gold in four of them.  Overall, he placed within the top 10 in 73% of the events. 2017 was a highly successful year for Bicsák. He would earn his first Triathlon World Cup in Tiszaujvaros.

In recognition of his excellent results and progress in 2016, in January 2017, Bence Bicsák was awarded by the Hungarian Triathlon Foundation for the second time. The Foundation awarded Bicsák the first award in 2014. As a beneficiary of the Hungarian 2020 Olympic training program, at the start of 2017, Bence Bicsák attended a training camp in the Canary Islands. Among the other training activities, and compared to Hungary's climate in the winter, the more favorable environment in the Canary Islands made it possible for Bicsák to bicycle 800 kilometers in two weeks.

After participating in a two-week training camp in Cyprus on March 26, 2017, Bence Bicsák placed 4th at the 2017 Gran Canaria ETU Triathlon European Cup Elite event. There was much chaos in the swim portion of the race. He exited the water 12th, reached the breakaway bike group in the first 10 km of the bike segment, and powered during his run to a 4th-place finish for his first competition of 2017.

On April 22, 2017, Bence Bicsák finished won gold at the Hungarian Sprint Duathlon National Championships held in Balatonboglar.

On June 4, 2017, Bence Bicsák finished 9th in the Cagliari ITU Triathlon World Cup Elite event. The event marked the second time that Bicsák finished in the top ten in a World Cup, and as a result, he ranked 66th place in the world ranking.

On July 22, 2017, Bence Bicsák wins his first World Triathlon Cup at the 2017 Tiszaujvaros ITU Triathlon World Cup Elite event.  Bicsák won Gold by arriving at the finish line 15 seconds before the three-time Olympian Dmitry Polyanski and thus earning for Hungary the second-ever gold medal in a Triathlon World Cup.  is the only other Hungarian triathlete to ever win a World Triathlon Cup. Two weeks before the World Cup event, Bicsák finished 7th at the European Athletics U23 Championships. Additionally, Bicsák finished 3rd in the 10,000-meter Adult National Championships.

On August 5, 2017, Bence Bicsák won gold at the Velence ETU Triathlon U23 European Championships event. After the European Championship event, Bicsák held 47th place in the world rankings.

In a September 12, 2017, publication, Bence Bicsák stated that being a triathlete comes with "quite a bit of pain." However, he added that gradually increasing his workload to multiple training sessions per day over many years helped him adapt. Thankful of the support from the University of Pécs, professors, and friends, Bence Bicsák stated that he had only one more session/internship to complete his degree.  Bence Bicsák emphasized that his dream was not just to qualify for the 2020 Olympics but to "leave with a good outcome." Furthermore, he added that his "ultimate goal is to become one of the world's best triathletes."  Bence Bicsák is majoring in Business Administration and Management at the University of Pécs – Faculty of Business and Economics.

2018: Competing at world-level 
For 2018, the World Triathlon rankings database indicates that Bence Bicsák competed in 13 triathlon events and won two Golds and a Bronze.  Overall, he placed within the top 10 in 62% of the races. In 2018, he competed in Asia, Canada, Australia, Europe, and the Middle East.

In 2018, the Hungarian Triathlon Union awarded the then 22-year-old Bence Bicsák for being the best U23 triathlon and duathlon athlete in 2017. Bence Bicsák's coach, Szilárd Tóth, was acknowledged as Coach of the Year in the same ceremony. In 2017, Szilárd Tóth was the head of the triathlon department in Pécs. The department consisted of a staff of about fifty people. By bicycling 200–300 km and running 60–70 km per week, coach Tóth actively participated in the triathletes' training.

On May 12, 2018, at the ITU World Triathlon Series (WTS) Yokohama Elite event, Bence Bicsák finished 5th. The WTS is where the best in the world compete; this Bicsák's second participation in the WTS. After the race, the then two-time World Champion and two-time Olympian Mario Mola shook Bicsák's hand to acknowledge Bicsák notable accomplishment. The Yokohama WTS was the first of forty triathlon Olympic Qualification events for the 2020 Games. The top 12 results determine the Olympic Qualification rankings.  ITU Triathlon World Cup events have a maximum of 75 competitors. However, ITU Triathlon World Series (WTS) has only 55 competitors, and many top-10 in the rankings tend to be present.

On May 21, 2018, after two events, Bence Bicsák was 1st in the ITU Individual Olympic Qualification Ranking. After the Lausanne ITU Triathlon World Cup where he finished 4th, on August 18, 2018, Bence Bicsák was 7th in the ITU Individual Olympic Qualification Ranking. A week later, after the ITU World Triathlon Montreal Elite event, he ranked 6th.

On September 14, 2018, at the ITU World Triathlon Grand Final Gold Coast U23 event, Bence Bicsák won Bronze sharing the podium with Tayler Reid and Samuel Dickenson.

Reflecting on the 2018 triathlon competition year, Bence Bicsák stated, "These results are noteworthy because no Hungarian triathlete has made (it) to the top 10 so far, and this was only my first year to race in world-level competitions."

In October 2018, Bence Bicsák stated that he trains in all three sports (swim, bike run) daily. Furthermore, during a race, that he maintains a pulse of about 190 beats per minute for about two hours. His coach Szilárd Tóth referred to Bence Bicsák as "the fine-tuned sports machine."

Olympic Qualification ranking aside, by November 2018, Bence Bicsák was 18th in the Triathlon World Rankings.

2018 being his first year competing at a world-class level, Bence Bicsák reported that everyone was kind and personally welcomed by most of the eminent athletes. He added that he would increase his training intensity but take a balanced and gradual approach to reach the top physical and mental form required to be at the Olympics. He indicated that he was making good progress and that he was confident. At the end of 2018, his first year competing in the top-tier World Triathlon Series (WTS), Bence Bicsák ranked 23rd.

One of Bicsák's stated goals for 2019 was to secure his Olympic Qualification ranking by participating in as many World Triathlon Series as possible. Another goal was to enjoy and love what he is doing and put as much effort into his university studies.

2019 
For 2019, the World Triathlon rankings database indicates that Bence Bicsák competed in 11 triathlon events and won two Bronze. Overall, he placed within the top 10 in 64% of the races.

On April 27, 2019, at the MS Amlin World Triathlon Bermuda Elite event, Bicsák finished 7th. His race result propelled him to 11th place in the World Triathlon Series Rankings, overtaking a two-time Olympian in the process. Post-race, Bicsák's performance captured the attention of the then five-time world champion triathlete legend.

On May 18, 2019, at the ITU World Triathlon Yokohama Elite event, Bicsák finished 3rd. Bicsák overtook the five-time world champion and Olympic Silver medalist Javier Gomez by 12 seconds to earn the Bronze. Furthermore, Bicsák shared the podium with the #1 ranked triathlete Vincent Luis and Olympic medalist Henri Schoeman. After one hour, forty-three minutes, and 26 seconds of racing, Bicsák was a mere five seconds from the Gold and 1 second from the Silver. The #1 ranked triathlete Vincent Luis was the first to congratulate Bicsák and told him that he knew that the moment would come. The result of the race placed Bicsák at 6th place in the Olympic Qualification rankings and 12th in the World rankings.[Bence Bicák's historic bronze medal in the triathlon World Cup series]

On May 27, 2019, Richárd László, Director of Toyota Central Europe, distributed a Toyota C-HR hybrid to Bence Bicsák and twelve other sponsored Olympic caliber athletes. Toyota was a Platinum Sponsor of the Hungarian Olympic Committee and also directly sponsored athletes like Bicsák. Krisztián Kulcsár, President of the Hungarian Olympic Committee, was present at the distribution ceremony.

On July 6, 2019, there was a multiple cyclist crash during the Hamburg Wasser World Triathlon Elite event. As a result, an injured Bence Bicsák needed transportation to a hospital. Unfortunately for Bicsák, the crash of bicycles ahead of him, while in a peloton formation, made the collision for him and others unavoidable. At a fast speed, he violently came into contact with a metal crowd barrier. He was ejected into the air as his bicycle came to a sudden and complete stop.

To make matters worse, it took quite a long time for the ambulance to reach Bicsák due to a parked tractor-trailer blocking access. Unfortunately, the accident in Hamburg made it impossible for him and the Hungarian team to compete in the Triathlon team-relay race on the following day. Although Bicsák had been in multiple crashes during his long career, this was the first time that he needed transportation to a hospital. Fortunately, there were no fractures or significant tears. Before the race in Hamburg, Bicsák had finished top-10 in all but one WTS event. After Hamburg, Bicsák was 16th in the World Rankings, 9th in the WTS rankings, and 10th in the Olympic Qualification rankings.

Because of his injuries, Bicsák training regimen needed adjustment, but he was hopeful regarding the remaining triathlon competition season. Following the Hamburg event, Bicsák was supposed to be at the World Championship event in Edmonton, Canada. Unfortunately, due to the recent stitches on his body, he would not compete there. In the weeks that followed, his knee was healing quickly. He participated in a high-altitude training camp in the USA. In his own words, "I was in a pretty bad place in terms of endurance, but even more so mentally, yet I still held onto my goals."

On August 16, 2019, the important Tokyo ITU World Triathlon Olympic Qualification event took place. The event was simultaneously a test of the 2020 Olympic venue and a triathlon Olympic Qualification event.

The Tokyo event occurred only 41 days after Bicsák's significant crash and injury in Hamburg. There was intense heat, near 100% humidity, and powerful winds due to an incoming typhoon. Due to extreme climate conditions, the organizers initially planned to shorten the race, but this did not occur. Consequently, the organizers maintained the total Olympic distance (1.5 km swim, 40 km bike, and 10 km run).

After a challenging swim, Bicsák caught up to the lead peloton but was involved in a mass bike crash. He recovered from the crash and, due to his remarkable running performance, managed to finish 7th.  Bicsák would later state that "… only a podium finish would have made me happy! It would have been more realistic to just give up at that point considering the mental state I was in." Two days later, the Hungarian mixed-relay team, of which Bicsák is a member, finished 9th. Despite the physical injuries sustained in Hamburg 41 days prior, the physical and mental fortitude displayed by Bence Bicsák at the Tokyo ITU World Triathlon Olympic Qualification event secured his top-10 Olympic Qualification ranking.  Being 9th in the rankings was remarkable, in that Bicsák was at a disadvantage compared to rivals because he had to miss out on the race in Edmonton due to injury.

Triathlon is an endurance sport that always takes a tremendous physical and mental toll at the elite level. For the recovering Bicsák, the toll in August 2019 was significantly greater than usual. Before the ITU World Triathlon Grand Final, Bicsák stated, "My Achilles tendon is aching, and there is barely any skin left on my heels. Even putting my race shoes on represents a challenge". He also stated, "I am additionally hoping for plain sailing at this (Grand Final) race – without any unfortunate events, and where following a smooth start, I won't have to fight my way back from the bottom. I have had a share of both of these situations recently." [August 31, 2019].

However, on August 31, 2019, at the Grand Final in Lausanne, Bence Bicsák finished 29th. Regarding the race, Bicsák later stated, "This race was the most painful. I wished I could have disappeared, to have become invisible after finishing 29th. I placed 13th overall, but there was still another event that kept creeping into my mind. I had my heart set on racing at the World Cup event in Banyoles"

On September 7, 2019, at the Banyoles ITU Triathlon World Cup event, and in a reversal of fortune from the Lausanne event two weeks prior, Bence Bicsák closed the triathlon racing season by finishing 3rd. Bence Bicsák's comeback performance in Banyoles was as "astonishing." Bicsák was 17 seconds away from the Silver obtained by the 5 -time World Champing Mario Mola and 19 seconds away from the Gold won by then-current World Champion Vincent Luis.

On October 17, 2019, Bence Bicsák was credited as providing Hungarian triathlon with increased momentum due to his numerous top-10 finishes in the top-tier World Triathlon Series (WTS).

2019 was Bence Bicsák's most challenging year of his life. There were high expectations and a great deal of pressure on the 23-year-old athlete. After the 2019 Yokohama event that had propelled him to 4th in the rankings, he stated, "I suddenly felt as though I was capable of anything." However, later, in the Hamburg WTS event, he went from the best shape of his life to a race-canceling injury. To his credit, by the year-end, Bicsák found the physical and mental fortitude to end on a triumph, albeit a painful one.

On December 30, 2019, the International Triathlon Union (ITU) officially ranked Bence Bicsák as having the #9 position in the Individual Olympic Qualification Ranking for the 2020 Tokyo Games.

2020 
At the beginning of 2020, Bicsák's 5784.78 points, 9th in the World Triathlon Individual Olympic Qualification rankings made him technically assured of qualifying for the 2020 Tokyo Olympics. However, Bicsák expressed that all athletes who make it to the Olympic games stand a medal chance regardless of how high their Olympic Qualification ranking is.

On January 15, 2020, a ceremony confirmed the establishment of a sponsorship agreement between the Hungarian Triathlon Union and global corporate giant E.ON. During the same ceremony, in recognition of Bence Bicsák's unprecedented triathlon results, E.ON announced that Bicsák was sponsored, and expected to have a top-10 finish at the Tokyo Olympic Games. Bicsák stated, "My primary goal is to become the world's best triathlete.". Historically, the best Hungarian result in an Olympics was 30th by Csaba Kuttor at the 2000 Sydney Olympic Games.

The World Health Organization (WHO) declared COVID-19 as a pandemic on March 11, 2020.

On March 24, 2020, in a joint statement, Japan's Prime Minister Shinzo Abe and the International Olympic Committee (IOC) president Thomas Bach officially announced the postponement of the 2020 Tokyo Olympic Games to a date no later than 2021.

Ever since he was a child, the Olympic Games had been one of Bence Bicsák's biggest dreams.   The impact of the postponement on Bence Bicsák and other Olympic caliber athletes was understandably and in numerous ways extremely disruptive and significant.

Bicsák had been training "like crazy," intending to reach his peak performance at the 2020 Olympics. However, COVID-19 restrictions closed or severely limited access to the training venues essential to keeping an elite athlete at their best performance level. In a triathlon, an athlete must balance training across all three sports. For Bicsák, who is physically smaller than most elite triathletes, not having access to a swimming facility was one of his most significant concerns.

The COVID-19 pandemic severely curtailed international travel, and most elite-level triathletes could not get to world-class triathlon events. Consequently, the World Triathlon organization postponed or canceled most triathlon events.

Due to not knowing when the international competition season could begin, elite triathletes competed primarily domestically when they could, at amateur events, and under COVID-19 restrictions. Bicsák's first such event was the eXtremeMan 2020 amateur event near Kaposvár. The Olympic distance event was Bicsák's first race in ten months. He came in first beating in the process two of his fellow National Team members. However, Bicsák's goal was not to defeat his competitors but to "promote each other's training" and determine his mental state.

In the summer of 2020, despite trying to find races to compete and due to the pandemic, Bence Bicsák found himself free for the first time in years. However, not being used to having free time and being inactive came with its challenges. Bicsák and his coach took three weeks off. Bicsák went fishing, stand-up-paddled, read books, played the guitar, and spent time with family and friends.

For all elite athletes, the harsh reality is that there are no suitable substitutes to live competition. By August 5, 2020, Bence Bicsák competed in 8 domestic races over five consecutive weekends. The most meaningful event was the Hungarian National Triathlon Championships, where he won Gold.

At the top-10 elite level, triathlons are often won or lost by small nuances. When competing together, top-10 elite athletes need to make numerous and minute adjustments to their tactics during a race. When a top-10 athlete competes below their usual level, it's their raw power and ability that tends to get expressed the most. Unfortunately, such races leave less opportunity to experience and refine the tactics required to win at an Olympic level.

By August 25, 2020, the COVID-19 pandemic resulted in the cancellation of 7 of the 8 World Triathlon Series (WTS) events. The only WTS event that remained possible was in Hamburg. The World Triathlon Executive Board decided that the singular Hamburg event would crown the 2020 WTS Champions. In theory, qualified triathletes from around the world could participate, and the number of allowed competitors, usually 55, was increased to 65. However, significant travel restrictions did prevent many of the usual competitors from attending.

Triathlon is a sport that has a lot of expenses associated with it. Unfortunately, for top-tier triathletes like Bicsák, another significant consequence of the cancellation of seven of the eight WTS events was the considerable decrease in opportunities to earn prize money.

On September 5, 2020, at the Hamburg Wasser World Triathlon Elite event, Bence Bicsák finished 14th. He was "somewhat frustrated." With regards to the event, Bicsák stated what follows. "The race in Hamburg was a significant one not only in terms of the coming year but also my career as a whole because this is the only means to achieve mental training." "This was the kind of racing that I missed. It is entirely different to cycle in a peloton of 60 bikers versus 4 or 5, like it was the case at home."

On September 5, 2020, at the Hamburg ITU Triathlon Mixed Relay World Championships event, the Hungarian team that Bicsák was a member of finished 12th.

On September 13, 2020, at the Karlovy Vary ITU Triathlon World Cup Elite event and recovering from a minor hit by a motorcycle cameraperson, Bence Bicsák finished 5th. Unfortunately for Bicsák, the motorcycle made a turn while Bicsák was attempting to pass. Bicsák was slightly hurt, but "quite a few contestants" passed him when he stopped to go around the motorcycle. In 2020, this was the only World Cup where Bicsák could compete. At the Karlovy Vary event, Bicsák's national teammate Márk Dévay was injured in a bike crash and required hospitalization during the race.

2021: The COVID-19 pandemic continues to disrupt competition 
On March 20, 2021, the International Olympic Committee and four other governing bodies announced that due to the COVID pandemic, overseas spectators would not be allowed to the Tokyo Olympic Games.
 
On March 25, 2021, the Olympic torch relay started in Japan. It signaled that the Olympic Games would likely begin 121 days later. The torch relay gave hope to thousands of elite athletes, Bicsák among them.

In a rebranding effort, on October 1, 2020, the International Triathlon Union became World Triathlon. Consequently, and for historical clarity, ITU events before October 1, 2020, remain identified as ITU. Similarly, on March 4, 2021, the ITU World Triathlon Series (WTS) became World Triathlon Championship Series (WTCS). Consequently, and for historical clarity, WTS events before 2021 remain identified as WTS.

At the start of 2021, the COVID pandemic continued to disrupt significantly the competition schedule set by World Triathlon. Uncertainty of the first WTCS race in Chengdu, the moving of the Montreal event and Adu Dhabi even t dates made travel and logistics planning a challenge.

On April 22, 2020, World Triathlon confirmed the schedule for the 2021 World Triathlon Championship Series (WTCS). The first event was for the triathlon in Chengdu, China, scheduled for May 1 and 2. Bicsák previously competed in Chengdu events in 2018 and 2019. Unfortunately, the 2020, the Chengdu event was canceled due to the pandemic. However, as of April 24, 2021, a mere eight days before the 2021 Chengdu WTCS event, the actual start date remained to be confirmed.

In a parallel triathlon competition series, the pandemic also played havoc with the 2021 Triathlon World Cup schedule. The cancelation of the 2021 Osaka Triathlon World Cup and the changed date of the Huatulco Triathlon World Cup signaled that the 2021 World Cup season might continue to have significant disruptions.

Due to COVID-19, the pre-Olympic 2021 triathlon season was exceptionally challenging for many elite triathletes trying to regain their peak performance. In four out of five 2021 pre-Olympic game events, Bence Bicsák finished well below his typical performance levels. However, on 13 June 2021, Bence Bicsák achieved a gold medal finish at the Grand-Prix triathlon event in Dunkirk.

As a member of the Hungarian 2020 Olympic Triathlon team, Bence Bicsák competed in the men's individual event at the 2020 Tokyo Olympic Summer Games. He placed 7th out of 51 Olympians that started the race.

Endorsements 
As a top-10 triathlete, Bence Bicsák has been able to obtain sponsorship from significant global corporate entities.  The professional video featuring Bence Bicsák in their pre-Olympic Games "For The Moment" campaign illustrated well the marketing attention that Bicsák received.

As of 3 May 2021, Bence Bicsák had the following corporate sponsors; Trek, E.ON, Mizuno, Pécs Brewery, Oakley, Toyota, Garmin and High5.

Career statistics 
The following list is based upon the official World Triathlon rankings and the Athletes' Profile Page

Further reading 
 Triathlon
 Triathlon equipment
 World Triathlon
 World Triathlon Championship Series
Triathlon at the 2020 Summer Olympics
Triathlon at the 2020 Summer Olympics – Men's; Start list , Event environment ,  Start positions , Results , Event facts , Event analysis , Qualification ranking 
Triathlon at the 2020 Summer Olympics – Women's 
Triathlon at the 2020 Summer Olympics – Mixed relay; Mixed - RelayStart list , Event environment , Start positions , Team composition ,  Results, Event facts , Event analysis , Qualification ranking  held at Odaiba Marine Park
 Triathlon at the Summer Olympics
 Hungary at the Olympics
 Alex Yee, placed 2nd at the 2020 Tokyo Olympics Men's individual Triathlon event
 Hayden Wilde, placed 3rd at the 2020 Tokyo Olympics Men's individual Triathlon event

References 

Living people
1995 births
Hungarian male triathletes
Olympic triathletes of Hungary
Triathletes at the 2020 Summer Olympics
People from Zalaegerszeg
Sportspeople from Zala County